Alderpoint (formerly, Alder Point) is a census-designated place in Humboldt County, California at an elevation of ,  east-northeast of Garberville. Its population is 137 as of the 2020 census, down from 186 from the 2010 census. The ZIP Code is 95511 and its area code is 707.

History
The town, named after the abundance of alder trees, began in 1910 as a center for construction of the Northwestern Pacific Railroad. The first post office at Alderpoint opened in 1911.

Demographics

The 2010 United States Census reported that Alderpoint had a population of 186. The racial makeup of Alderpoint was 170 (91.4%) White, 0 (0.0%) African American, 9 (4.8%) Native American, 1 (0.5%) Asian, 0 (0.0%) Pacific Islander, 1 (0.5%) from other races, and 5 (2.7%) from two or more races. Hispanic or Latino of any race were 10 persons (5.4%).

The Census reported that 186 people (100% of the population) lived in households, 0 (0%) lived in non-institutionalized group quarters, and 0 (0%) were institutionalized.

There were 80 households, out of which 19 (23.8%) had children under the age of 18 living in them, 29 (36.3%) were opposite-sex married couples living together, 10 (12.5%) had a female householder with no husband present, 9 (11.3%) had a male householder with no wife present. There were 9 (11.3%) unmarried opposite-sex partnerships, and 0 (0%) same-sex married couples or partnerships. 29 households (36.3%) were made up of individuals, and 3 (3.8%) had someone living alone who was 65 years of age or older. The average household size was 2.33. There were 48 families (60.0% of all households); the average family size was 2.83.

The population was spread out, with 32 people (17.2%) under the age of 18, 11 people (5.9%) aged 18 to 24, 43 people (23.1%) aged 25 to 44, 75 people (40.3%) aged 45 to 64, and 25 people (13.4%) who were 65 years of age or older. The median age was 47.0 years. For every 100 females, there were 111.4 males. For every 100 females age 18 and over, there were 126.5 males.

The homeowner vacancy rate was 0%; the rental vacancy rate was 0%. 144 people (77.4% of the population) lived in owner-occupied housing units and 42 people (22.6%) lived in rental housing units.

Climate

Politics

Notable people
Michael Bear Carson and Suzan Carson, serial killers
Frank Cieciorka, graphic artist
ED Denson, managed the prominent band Country Joe and The Fish that performed at Woodstock. In later years, he built a successful law practice that centered around representing the local marijuana growers in the area.

Historic "Murder Mountain"
The Rancho Sequoia area of Alderpoint is called "Murder Mountain" from the actions of the Carson serial killers (Michael Bear Carson and Suzan Carson), including the murder of 26-year-old Clark Stephens on May 17, 1982, and for other disappearances, murders and rumored murders.

Two high-profile missing persons are Robert "Bobby" Tennison, a 38-year-old father of four, missing since January 2009, and Garret Rodriguez, a 29-year-old from San Diego, California, who was reported missing on April 25, 2013, by his father. In their last conversation in December 2012, Rodriguez told his father, Val Rodriguez, he was headed to "Murder Mountain" to work on a marijuana grow. After he went missing, his truck was found in June 2013. On November 28, 2013, human remains were found in a grave on a private property on Jewett Road, one day after a group of locals forced the admission from the suspect known to have committed the murder, about the exact location of a grave believed to be Rodriguez's. On December 17, the remains were identified as Rodriguez's, and he was confirmed a victim of a homicide. It is suspected that the anonymous tip came from a confession extracted from the man responsible for the murder, who gave up the information after being kidnapped, shot twice, and threatened by a group of eight local vigilantes on Thanksgiving Day. In 2018, Rodriguez and "Murder Mountain" were featured in the Netflix documentary series Murder Mountain.

Across the valley from Rancho Sequoia on Pratt Mountain, in 1973, 24-year-old Dirk Dickenson was shot in the back by a federal agent during a military-style federal raid which arrived at his property by helicopter. Dickenson was found blameless by a Federal Department of Justice investigation; charges against his killer were moved to federal court and ultimately dismissed. Dickenson was posthumously featured on the cover of Rolling Stone and is recognized as the first victim of the U.S. war on drugs.

See also
 
 Sequoia County, California
 Murder Mountain (TV series)

References

Further reading
 
 

Census-designated places in Humboldt County, California
Populated places established in 1910
Census-designated places in California